Toby Roger Hughes (born 15 February 1979) is an English former first-class cricketer.

Hughes was born at Stourport-on-Severn in February 1979. He was educated at Oldbury Wells School, before going up to Homerton College, Cambridge. While studying at Cambridge, he played first-class cricket for both Cambridge University and Cambridge UCCE from 2000–02. He made seven appearances for Cambridge University, which included two appearances in The University Match against Oxford, in addition to four appearances for Cambridge UCCE. Playing as a right-arm medium-fast bowler, he took 17 wickets in his eleven first-class matches, at an average of 50.76, with best figures of 3 for 55. 13 of these wickets came for Cambridge University.

Notes and references

External links

1979 births
Living people
People from Stourport-on-Severn
People educated at Oldbury Wells School
Alumni of Homerton College, Cambridge
English cricketers
Cambridge University cricketers
Cambridge MCCU cricketers